Christ Air is an aerial skateboarding trick where, while flying in the air, the skateboarder picks up their board into one of their hands and then spreads their arms and straightens their legs forming a pose that resembles Jesus Christ on the cross. It was invented by skater Christian Hosoi. Recently, Denmark's Rune Glifberg has become the Christ Air's most famous practitioner. Danny Way has also performed the Christ Air.

References

Skateboarding tricks